This is a partial list of known accretion-powered pulsars, as of 1997.

LMXB

IMXB

HMXB

BeXB

See also
 Lists of astronomical objects

References

 Observations of Accreting Pulsars, Bildsten, L., et al., 1997, Astrophysical Journal Supplement Series, 113, p. 367

+List of X-ray pulsars
List of X-ray pulsars

X-ray pulsars